Rankin Inlet South (Inuinnaqtun: Kangirliniq Hivuraa) is a territorial electoral district (riding) for the Legislative Assembly of Nunavut, Canada.

The riding consists of part of Rankin Inlet. The district was created prior to the 28 October 2013 general election. The community used to be in Rankin Inlet South/Whale Cove.

The election resulted in a tie and a recount was held November 5. This confirmed the tie, forcing a by-election on February 10, 2014 which was won by Alexander Sammurtok.

Election results

2013 election

2014 by-election

2017 election

References

Electoral districts of Kivalliq Region
2013 establishments in Nunavut